The Mad Dog is the name of four fictional characters in the DC Comics universe. Two of them are associated with Batman.

Publication history
The third Mad Dog was created by writer Andersen Gabrych and artist Ale Garza. He first appeared as an enemy of Cassandra Cain (then Batgirl) in Batgirl (vol. 2) #67 (October 2005).

Fictional character biography

Lucas "Mad Dog" McGill
Lucas "Mad Dog" McGill is a highly dangerous criminal who is wanted in several states for multiple counts of murder and notorious for shooting men in the back. One night while beating a woman in the streets, he met a young Jonah Hex (who was drunk at the time). In his inebriated state, Jonah Hex believed that McGill was his father Woodson Hex abusing his mother Ginny and shot him dead where he stood. He was rewarded with a substantial sum of money by the local sheriff immediately afterward. This encounter inspired Jonah Hex to become a bounty hunter. Jonah's wife, Tall Bird, later recounted this story to historians documenting Jonah Hex's life story.

Martin "Mad Dog" Hawkins
A serial killer named Martin Mad Dog Hawkins was created in Who's Who: The Definitive Directory of the DC Universe #1 and featured in Arkham Asylum: A Serious House on Serious Earth. Batman reads about him in Amadeus Arkham's diaries. Hawkins comes from a wealthy, prominent family, and from a young age is beaten and sexually abused by his father. He grows up to become a serial killer who rapes, mutilates and murders women and young girls, removing their faces and sexual organs post-mortem; he also engages in self-harm "just to feel something". He claims to see visions of the Virgin Mary, who tells him to "stop the dirty sluts from spreading their disease". When he is finally caught, he is institutionalized in the State Psychiatric Hospital in Metropolis, treated by psychiatrist Amadeus Arkham. When Arkham goes back to Gotham City and opens Arkham Asylum, he goes back home to find that Hawkins had broken into his house and raped,murdered his wife and daughter. Hawkins is quickly captured again and sentenced to Arkham Asylum, becoming one of its first patients, once again under Amadeus Arkham's care. During their sessions, Hawkins takes great pleasure in describing the murders of Arkham's family in minute detail, even calling Arkham's daughter a whore. Arkham appears to take this all in his stride, and perseveres, earning praise from his colleagues for his dedication to mental health and rehabilitation. On the anniversary of the murder, Arkham announces that he will perform experimental electroshock therapy upon Hawkins, under the pretense of trying to cure him. Once Hawkins is strapped down to the operating table, Arkham turns up the voltage as high as it will go, inflicting as much pain upon Hawkins as possible before he finally dies. Hawkins' death is treated as an accident. It marks the beginning of Arkham's own descent into madness, however; Arkham is eventually institutionalized in his own hospital.

David Cain's son

David Cain, one of the world's premier assassins, was by the nature of his profession a very lonely man and began thinking about what he would leave behind when he died. He wished for a "perfect child" – specifically a "perfect artisan of his craft".

Cain, was at this time, a member of Ra's al Ghul's League of Assassins. Ra's had created the League to be "the fang that protects his head", but he had grown tired of the uncertain loyalties of its members. When he learned of the theories Cain was developing to train a perfect killer, Ra's was intrigued, and supplied Cain with infant test subjects in the hopes of creating a new generation of assassins. This experiment proved disastrous; those infants that survived eventually turned on one another until only one boy remained. Ra's ordered one of his "Ubu" guards to kill the boy "like a mad dog". The guard, however, took pity on the abused child, and secretly set him free in the woods instead. Cain and Ra's al Ghul did not know that the boy still lived, and Cain began a new experiment, raising his own daughter, Cassandra, to replace his earlier failures.

Ra's al Ghul's daughter Nyssa Raatko did know that "the Mad Dog" had survived. Years later, after Ra's' death, she sought out The Mad Dog and made him a member of her new League of Assassins. She took him on as a protégé, telling him everything about the experiments, and about who he was intended to be.

Cassandra gathered evidence indicating that Lady Shiva was her mother, and sought out Shiva to confirm this. At the time Shiva was the sensei of Nyssa's new League. When Batgirl arrived she played a key role in the rebirth of Mr. Freeze's wife Nora Fries as the monstrous Lazara, and several League members died in the resulting chaos. Due to the conflict between their loyalty to Shiva and Nyssa and their near-worship of Batgirl as "the One Who is All" the League split at that point, with several members pledging themselves to Cassandra. Several more members of the League (including all the defectors except one) died when the Mad Dog went on a killing spree. The Mad Dog was successful in killing Batgirl (who gave her life to protect the last of the defected assassins), although she was able to knock him unconscious before perishing. Cassandra was quickly restored to life in a Lazarus Pit by Shiva. The Mad Dog's fate is unknown.

Rex
In The New 52 (a reboot of DC's continuity), a new character named Mad Dog appeared with only his first name reveled Rex. This version of the character works as bounty hunter for an unnamed organization that "pays his bills", but has ties to the League of Assassins and Leviathan. He is hired to go after the Suicide Squad to recover a newborn baby the Squad had kidnapped. Mad Dog knows Deadshot's secret identity, and is surprised that Deadshot is a member of the Suicide Squad and not incarcerated at Belle Reve. While using thermal vision on his mask to see through smoke, Mad Dog shoots Black Spider in the chest and blows up a diner with Black Spider and El Diablo still inside. Before he can fire any more shots and steal "the package", Harley Quinn releases knockout gas into the room to prevent further gunfire. Mad Dog and his team find Deadshot and Harley at their hideout and chase them inside. Harley has once again turned on the gas to prevent any gunfire from Mad Dog inside the hideout. They evacuate the building, which then explodes. As Mad Dog flees, swearing revenge on Deadshot, he encounters King Shark. When King Shark rejoins his fellow Squad members, he is seen wearing Mad Dog's necklace, implying that he killed him.

During DC Rebirth, Mad Dog appears on the one-shot special Suicide Squad: War Crimes Special #1. After being charged with a crime he claims he didn't commit, he is forced to join Amanda Waller's Task Force X. Like the other members, he has a bomb planted on his brain; in case the Suicide Squad failed their mission or were captured, Waller would blow up the implants, killing them. During a mission to retrieve a retired American politician who had been kidnapped and taken to Europe to be tried for war crimes, Mad Dog is injured and asks Captain Boomerang to help him get on the escape vehicle. Boomerang betrays him by kicking him off the vehicle, allowing him to be captured. To prevent the mission from being compromised, Waller detonates Mad Dog's implant, killing him.

In other media
Mad Dog makes a minor appearance in the Batwoman episode "Off With Her Head". This version is an African-American small-time gangster.

References

External links
 Mad Dog (Lucas McGill) at DC Comics Wiki
 Mad Dog (Martin Hawkins) at DC Comics Wiki
 Mad Dog III at DC Comics Wiki
 Mad Dog IV at DC Comics Wiki

Comics characters introduced in 2005
Comics characters introduced in 1989
Mad Dog, The
Mad Dog, The
Mad Dog, The
Fictional rapists
DC Comics supervillains
Fictional pedophiles
Fictional bounty hunters
Self-harm in fiction
Fictional murderers of children
Fictional characters involved in incest
Fictional victims of child sexual abuse
Suicide Squad members